Rikako (written 里花子, 莉佳子, 梨香子, 理香子, 里歌子, 璃花子 or 立花子) is a feminine Japanese given name. Notable people with the name include:

, Japanese voice actress
, Japanese actress and voice actress
, Japanese swimmer
, Japanese women's footballer
Rikako Miura (born 1989), Japanese water polo player
, Japanese golfer
, Japanese model and actress
, Japanese idol, singer and actress
, Japanese voice actress

Japanese feminine given names